The Compromise Independent Smallholders' Party (KFKGP), was an agrarianist political party in Hungary, after having its members left the Independent Smallholders, Agrarian Workers and Civic Party (FKGP).

History
The party was founded on 2 October 1993 in Debrecen by gardener Sándor Cseh, who was replaced as vice-president and expelled from FKGP on 11 June 1992, following a failed coup attempt against party leader József Torgyán. The cooperation negotiations have broken down with the pro-government faction Group of 36 MPs, who, as a result, also founded a separate party, named the United Smallholders' Party (EKGP). The KFKGP intended to unite the smallholders' group which opposed the leadership and influence of Torgyán in the agrarian politics.

For the 1994 parliamentary election, the KFKGP set up two regional county lists (Hajdú-Bihar and Szabolcs-Szatmár-Bereg) and its seven individual candidates run in the election. The party received 0.11 percent of the votes and won no seats. Following that failure, the party gradually became defunct and dissolved in 2003, after it did not participate in the 1998 and 2002 national elections.

Election results

National Assembly

References

Sources

1993 establishments in Hungary
2003 disestablishments in Hungary
Agrarian parties in Hungary
Defunct political parties in Hungary
Political parties disestablished in 2003
Political parties established in 1993